Cochylimorpha declivana is a species of moth of the family Tortricidae. It is found in Amur Oblast in the Russian Far East.

References

Moths described in 1901
Cochylimorpha
Moths of Asia